The Gabonese Football Federation is the governing body of football in Gabon. It was founded in 1962, affiliated to FIFA in 1966. It organises the national football league, as well as the men's and women's national teams.

References

External links
  Official website
 Gabon at the FIFA website.
Gabon at the CAF website.

Gabon
Football in Gabon
Sports organizations established in 1962
Football